Oruj-e Mohammad Kandi (also Romanized as Orūj-e Moḩammad Kandī and Orūj Mohamm’d Kandī; also known as Arooh Mohammad, Druj Muhammadkand, Druj Muhammad-Kend, Orūj-e Moḩammad, Orūj Kand, Orūj Moḩammad, Oruj Muhammad-Kend, and Ūrūi Moḩammad Kandī) is a village in Zangebar Rural District, in the Central District of Poldasht County, West Azerbaijan Province, Iran. At the 2006 census, its population was 531, in 119 families.

References 

Populated places in Poldasht County